Francis Joseph Dixon (April 1, 1878 – November 29, 1932) was a Canadian lacrosse player who competed in the 1908 Summer Olympics. He was part of the Canadian team which won the gold medal.

References

1878 births
1932 deaths
Canadian lacrosse players
Olympic lacrosse players of Canada
Lacrosse players at the 1908 Summer Olympics
Olympic gold medalists for Canada
Medalists at the 1908 Summer Olympics
Olympic medalists in lacrosse